Ludo Frijns (born 22 March 1957) is a Belgian former professional racing cyclist. He rode in the 1982 Tour de France.

References

External links

1957 births
Living people
Belgian male cyclists
People from Tongeren
Cyclists from Limburg (Belgium)